Marian Skubacz (8 April 1958 – 21 February 2023) was a Polish wrestler. He competed in the men's freestyle 62 kg at the 1988 Summer Olympics.

Skubacz died on 21 February 2023, at the age of 64.

References

1958 births
2023 deaths
Polish male sport wrestlers
Olympic wrestlers of Poland
Wrestlers at the 1988 Summer Olympics
Sportspeople from Ruda Śląska